PS-5 Kashmore-II is a constituency of the Provincial Assembly of Sindh.

See also
 PS-4 Kashmore-I
 PS-6 Kashmore-III

References

External links
 Election commission Pakistan's official website
 Awazoday.com check result
 Official Website of Government of Sindh

Constituencies of Sindh